Gerd Zacher (6 July 1929 – 9 June 2014) was a German composer, organist, and writer on music. He specialized in contemporary compositions, many of which feature extended techniques, and are written in graphic or verbal scores. He interpreted the scores of numerous contemporary composers, including John Cage, Juan Allende-Blin, Mauricio Kagel, György Ligeti, Hans Otte, Luis de Pablo, and Isang Yun. He is also known as an interpreter of the works of Johann Sebastian Bach.

Zacher was born in Meppen and lived in Essen, Germany.

Writings

On music 
 Analyse der Orgel – ein Interpretationskurs. In: Internationale Ferienkurse für neue Musik. 26. 1972. – Mainz [u.a.] : Schott, 1973. (Darmstädter Beiträge zur neuen Musik ; 13)
 Bach gegen seine Interpreten verteidigt : Aufsätze 1987–1992. München : Edition Text u. Kritik, 1993. – 170 pages – (Musik-Konzepte ; 79/80)
 Beobachtungen an Erik Saties «Messe des pauvres». In: Erik Satie. – 2., erw. Aufl. – München : Edition Text u. Kritik, 1988. – pp. 48–63. – (Musik-Konzepte ; 11)
 Canonische Veränderungen, BWV 769 und 769 a. In: Bach Johann Sebastian – Das spekulative Spätwerk. – 2., unveränd. Aufl. – München : Edition Text u. Kritik, 1999. – pp. 3–19. – (Musik-Konzepte ; 17/18)
 Der geheime Text des Contrapunctus IV von Bach (Anregungen der Sprache für die Ausprägung von Musik). In: Stefan Klöckner (Hrsg.): Godehard Joppich zum 60. Geburtstag, Bosse, Regensburg 1992, pp. 219–237
 Die Erfahrung der Abwesenheit Gottes in der Musik des 20. Jahrhunderts. In: Wolfhart Pannenberg (Hrsg.): Die Erfahrung der Abwesenheit Gottes in der modernen Kultur, Vandenhoek & Ruprecht, Göttingen 1984, pp. 137–159
 Die Kunst einer Fuge. Als Begleitheft zur Wergo-CD 6184-2, 1990
 Die riskanten Beziehungen zwischen Sonate und Kirchenlied : Mendelssohns Orgelsonaten op. 65 Nr. 1 und 6 .In: Felix Mendelssohn Bartholdy. – München : Edition Text u. Kritik, 1980. – pp. 34–45. – (Musik-Konzepte; 14/15)
 Eine Fuge ist eine Fuge ist eine Fuge (Liszts B-A-C-H-Komposition für Orgel). In: Musik und Kirche 47, 1977, H. 1, pp. 15–23
 Erfahrungen bei der Interpretation graphisch notierter Orgelmusik. In: Rundbrief des Landeskirchenmusikdirektors der Evang. Luth. Landeskirche Schleswig-Holstein, December 1966, pp. 8f.
 Frescobaldi und die instrumentale Redekunst. In: Musik und Kirche 45, 1975, H. 2, pp. 54–64
 "«Ich kenne des Menschen nicht» : ein musikwissenschaftliches Dilemma (Zu Bachs Kunst der Fuge, Contrapunctus XI)". In. Musik und Kirche. vol. 56. 1986. 6. pp. 298–299
 Komponierte Formanten .In: Aimez-vous Brahms 'the Progressive'?. – München : Edition Text u. Kritik, 1989. – pp. 69–75. – (Musik-Konzepte ; 65)
 Livre d'orgue – eine Zumutung. In: Olivier Messiaen. – München : Edition Text u. Kritik, 1982. – pp. 92–107. – (Musik-Konzepte ; 28)
 Materialsammlung zu Dieter Schnebels Choralvorspielen. In: Dieter Schnebel. – München : Edition Text u. Kritik, 1980. – pp. 12–22. – (Musik-Konzepte , 16)
 Max Reger. Zum Orgelwerk. In: Musik-Konzepte Nr. 115, 2002
 Meine Erfahrungen mit der «Improvisation ajoutée». In: Kagel, 1991. Hrsg. von Werner Klüppelholz. – Köln : DuMont, 1991. – pp. 136–154
 Orgelmusik vor 20, 30 Jahren, als unsere Gegenwart noch Zukunft war. In: Acta Organologica, Bd. 17, Berlin 1984, pp. 406–415
 Randbemerkungen über das Zählen in Schönbergs «Ein Überlebender aus Warschau».In: Arnold Schönberg. – München : Edition Text u. Kritik, 1980. – pp. 146–150. – (Musik-Konzepte ; Sonderband)
 Schöpferische Tradition statt Historismus. In: Acta Organologica, Bd. 17, Berlin 1984, pp. 184–207
 Über eine vergessene Tradition des Legatospiels. In: Musik und Kirche 43,, 1973, H. 4, pp. 166–171
 Werkzeug Orgel. In: Der Kirchenmusiker 19, 1968, H. 5, pp. 1–4
 Zu Anton Weberns Bachverständnis. In: Anton Webern I. – München : Edition Text u. Kritik, 1983. – pp. 290–305. – (Musik-Konzepte ; Sonderband)

 Translations from the Spanish language 
 Pablo de Rokha: Der große Kummer (Übersetzung: Gerd Zacher u. Juan Allende-Blin). In: Alternative Zeitschrift für Dichtung und Diskussion, 1961, H. 21, S.133 – 135 
 Pablo Neruda: Es gibt keine Vergessenheit (Sonate), Vicente Huidobro: Allein, Óscar Castro: Engel und Papierdrachen Übersetzung: Gerd Zacher u. Juan Allende-Blin). In Gotthard Speer/Hansjürgen Winterhoff (Hrsg.): Meilensteine eines Komponistenlebens. Kleine Festschrift zum 70. Geburtstag von Günter Bialas. Bärenreiter, Kassel 1977, pp. 16f.

 Compositions 
 1954: Fünf Transformationen für Klavier, op. 3
 1960: Magnificat für zweistimmigen Chor, Bläser (oder Orgel) und Pauken, Edition Häusler, Stuttgart
 1961: Differencias für Orgel, Ed. Peters, Leipzig
 1968: Szmaty (Palm 22,19) für Orgel. Isang Yun gewidmet (unveröffentlicht)
 1968: 700000 Tage später (eine Lukaspassion) für gemischten Chor (12 bis 28 Mitwirkende)(unveröffentlicht).
 1968/69: "Die Kunst einer Fuge" d.i. Bachs Contrapunctus I in 10 Interpretationen für Orgel (CD: Wergo, 1996)
 1987: 75 event(ualitie)s für Orgel und Tonband. Zum 75. Geburtstag von John Cage (unveröffentlicht)
 1993: Trapez (in memoriam Hans Henny Jahnn) für Orgel (unveröffentlicht)
 L'heure qu'il est für zwei Klaviere im Vierteltonabstand (unveröffentlicht)

 References 

 Further reading 
 Hommage à Gerd Zacher : zum 70. Geburtstag von Gerd Zacher. Mit Beiträgen von Juan Allende-Blin, Philipp C. A. Klais, Klaus Linder, Gerd Zacher u.a., Hrsg.: Forum Kreuzeskirche Essen e.V., Essen, 1999. – VII, 180 pages – (2. Orgelwoche der Essener Kreuzeskirche), programme booklet
 Juan Allende-Blin: "Gerd Zacher – einige Erinnerungen". In: Juan Allende-Blin : Ein Leben aus Erinnerung und Utopie, eds. Stefan Fricke and Werner Klüppelholz. – Saarbrücken : Pfau, c 2002. – pp. 26–31
 Richard Hauser: "Zugänge : Gerd Zachers Festival 'Die Kunst einer Fuge' ". In: Johann Sebastian Bach – Das spekulative Spätwerk. – 2nd unchanged ed. – Munich, Edition Text u. Kritik, 1999. – pp. 114–132. – (Musik-Konzepte ; 17/18)
 Klaus Linder: "Gerd Zacher". In Hanns-Werner Heister / Walter-Wolfgang Sparrer (ed.): Komponisten der Gegenwart. Edition Text + Kritik, München 1992
 Diederich Lüken: "... die menschliche Unkenntnis verringern ... : der Organist Gerd Zacher". In: Neue Zeitschrift für Musik. vol. 147. 1986. 11. pp. 30–32.
 Michael Stenger: "Essen – Neue Wege durch Aktive Musik". In: Neue Musik seit den achtziger Jahren''. vol. 2. – Regensburg : Con Brio Verlag, 1994. – pp. 131–137

1929 births
2014 deaths
20th-century classical composers
German classical composers
21st-century classical composers
German classical organists
Kirchenmusikdirektor
Deutsche Grammophon artists
German male organists
Contemporary classical music performers
German male classical composers
20th-century German composers
21st-century German composers
20th-century German male musicians
21st-century German male musicians
20th-century organists
21st-century organists
20th-century German non-fiction writers
20th-century German male writers
21st-century German non-fiction writers
21st-century German male writers
German male non-fiction writers
German writers about music
Male classical organists